The DC Minyan is a lay-led Jewish congregation in the Dupont Circle area of Washington, D.C., with programs including Shabbat/Sabbath and Holy Day worship services, education, social events (for singles, couples, and families), retreats, and opportunities for tikkun olam, improving and transforming the world. The majority of its worship services, educational programs, and special events take place at the Washington, D.C. Jewish Community Center (DCJCC).

The group was created with a dual commitment to halacha/Jewish law and egalitarianism. The leaders and members of the community seek to create "a warm and intellectually engaging community for prayer and study." Additionally, Beth Tritter, one of the group's four co-founders, states that the minyan has been able to create worship services that exhibit "ruach [spirit] and kavanah [spiritual focus]." The DC Minyan is part of a growing number of similar lay-led programs within the national and international Jewish community, such as New York's Kehilat Hadar and Jerusalem's Shira Hadasha and Kehilat Kedem, that are sometimes described as being part of "the independent minyan movement."

The name, minyan, comes from the Hebrew word (מנין) for the prayer quorum traditionally required for a full Jewish prayer service.

History
The DC Minyan first began meeting in February 2002, at Luna Books, a bookstore in Dupont Circle. Its original founders were a mixture of young Jews from Judaism's Conservative movement and the Modern Orthodox group within Orthodox Judaism, who were in search of a setting for worship that combined traditional prayers and rituals with an egalitarian approach to the inclusion of women. (The four original founders actually had "been raised" within three movements of Judaism—Orthodox, Conservative, and Reform, but at the time of their meeting, two were attending Conservative synagogues, and two were attending Orthodox synagogues.)

As the congregation grew, it moved to its present location, The Washington, D.C. Jewish Community Center, in the late Spring of 2002. For special occasions, such as worship services for the High Holy Days, when space requirements or scheduling needs make it impossible to use the Center, the congregation has used a number of other nearby buildings, including the Westin Embassy Row Hotel.

Worship, education, and community life

Programs at the DC Minyan include guided individual study; study group including the DC Beit Midrash (cosponsored by the DCJCC); celebrations of life-cycle events; and volunteer opportunities, often linked to programs at the DCJCC. The congregational website offers audio files for individual prayers and prayer services, to help individuals learn "synagogue skills" that include leading the service or a portion of it, and reading from the weekly Torah portion and haftarah (the weekly portion from the Prophets).

Hospitality is also stressed as a foundational concept for community, and programs offered in this area include initiatives that coordinate invitations for Sabbath or holy day meals between those seeking a place and those with a place at their table to offer.

However, the goal of creating and offering vibrant worship services that combine tradition and egalitarianism remains at the core of the minyan's offerings. As of 2010, Saturday morning worship services are held on the first and third Saturday of each month, and Friday night Sabbath evening services are held on the second and fourth Fridays of each month, in the DCJCC. Other locations are used when required, almost always in the Northwest section of Washington, D.C.

Balancing egalitarianism and tradition
The founders of the DC Minyan were committed to a traditional approach to worship and Jewish life, but determined to push the limits of tradition to include women to the greatest extent possible. They began by studying ancient Jewish legal texts, with the goal of learning the position of traditional authorities, "with an eye towards including women in the services . . . even allowing them to take a leadership role." 

The congregation's commitment to both traditionalism and egalitarianism has resulted in a number of innovative policies and practices that sometimes reflect approaches of other groups, and sometimes are a hybrid of past approaches. So, for example, the worship setting includes separate seating for men and women (with a space in between the sections, rather than using a more traditional mechitza, or physical wall), but calling up women as well as men to lead worship and read from the Torah.

But, while precedent was found for prayer without a mechitzah, and even for calling women up to the Torah, no traditional source seemed to allow conducting certain portions of the worship service without a minyan—a prayer quorum—of ten adult men, a situation that seemed to ignore and show a certain amount of disrespect for the women who had come to pray. The compromise agreed upon at the early DC Minyan services was that the portions of the service that did require such a minyan would not be conducted unless there were both ten men and ten women. According to some sources, this approach, sometimes referred to as the "10-and-10 minyan," was originally crafted by the minyan, Shira Hadasha, in Jerusalem, inspiring a number of other groups around the world to follow the same example. (The Jewish Orthodox Feminist Alliance uses the term, Partnership minyan, for lay-led worship groups that consider themselves to be part of Modern Orthodox Judaism, while trying to increase the role of women in services through practices like the 10-and-10-minyan.)  In 2018, after extensive halakhic study, DC Minyan decided to adopt a policy of simply counting any 10 Jewish adults, regardless of gender, as a minyan.

In addition to efforts to respect and accommodate egalitarianism, there are also obvious signs of pluralism in terms of the various movements within Judaism. So, for example, many of the worshipers use Orthodox prayer books, but others follow in prayer books created by the Conservative movement. Similarly, participants follow the Torah reading with various printed editions of chumashim, with commentaries on the readings from the Torah and haftarah (Prophetic readings) that sometimes offer divergent translations and interpretations of the text, depending upon the movement that published the book.

Independent minyanim

The DC Minyan is part of a growing number of similar groups known as independent minyanim. There have been other attempts over the years to create settings for worship outside of the traditional structure, such as the chavurah movement. However, Jewish Theological Seminary of America Professor Jack Wertheimer states that today's independent minyanim (plural of "minyan") represent a different phenomenon:

...members of today's independent minyanim are not counter-cultural types in rebellion against their parents or committed to smashing existing institutions but a generation that is at once self-sufficient and open to compromise. An example of the newer spirit is the DC Minyan's commitment to separate seating, an infringement on the principle of strict sexual egalitarianism that is maintained for the sake of accommodating the group's diverse population. In the present moment, pluralism is valued over purity.

Rabbi Elie Kaunfer, rosh yeshiva (Rabbinic dean) and executive director of Mechon Hadar and on the Talmud faculty of Yeshivat Hadar, in 2009 defined an "independent minyan"—Jewish worshiping communities like the DC Minyan—as a congregation meeting three requirements: (1) volunteer-led and organized with no paid clergy; (2) no denomination/movement affiliation; and (3) founded in the previous 10 years. Kaunfer adds the goal of "spiritual prayer" to this list, noting that he himself often experienced worship services more as a "community experience" than as a "spiritual one." He notes that Kehilat Hadar began in New York as a result of a number of young Jews who were "looking for new ways to connect to the substance of their religion and tradition"—but instead of becoming "just a local minyan," "it became a model of grassroots religious community that spread dramatically across the United States and Israel. That model of community came to be known as an "independent minyan."

Kaunfer emphasizes that the word "independent" means that many of these groups developed independently in terms of volunteers coming together to create and lead it, but—in agreement with Wertheimer's assessment of these minyanim—they are not nor do they seek to be independent of the larger Jewish community in terms of their vision or self-identity. "Quite the contrary," he says, "they see themselves filling a need not being met by existing institutions, but operating within the larger Jewish map, not outside or against it."

Leadership and guidance
Ongoing leadership for the DC Minyan is provided by the members of the Steering Committee and the Leadership Council, with frequent input from all participants, and proactive efforts to receive input and ideas from the outside community. So, for example, the DC Minyan website describes "The DC Minyan Dialogue" as "an effort initiated by DC Minyan's leadership to take the pulse of the community by soliciting ideas and feedback on DC Minyan's programming, leadership structure, and decision-making processes." Additionally, a "kashrut task force" was convened to "study Jewish source texts on kashrut, research the policies of other communities, consider relevant teshuvot (halakhic responsa) relating to communal kashrut standards, and solicit feedback from community members about the current policy." 

The Leadership Council includes special volunteers for administration, the Beit Midrash, Chinuch (education), community relations, finance, gabbai, hospitality, parents and kids, social action, and special events. In addition, there are special voluntary positions that include representatives or coordinators for the "Dvar Tefillah and Torah" (words of prayer and Torah), the Friday Night Oneg (reception/collation), "greening"/ecological issues, happy hours, Shabbat morning "kiddush" (reception/collation), life cycle events, technical/website support, and a liaison for LGBTQ (Lesbian, Gay, Bisexual, Transgender, and Queer/Questioning) issues.

Although there is no rabbi officially affiliated with the congregation, the FAQ (Frequently Asked Questions) section of the congregational website notes that one rabbi who is consulted on a regular basis is Rabbi Ethan Tucker, the co-founder, rosh yeshiva (Rabbinic dean), and Legal Chair of Hadar, in New York. Rabbis in the D.C. area also offer assistance, including support for life-cycle events and pastoral care, on an as-needed basis.

See also
Book Review: "Empowered Judaism: How Independent Minyanim Can Teach Us about Building Vibrant Jewish Communities," by Rabbi Elie Kaunfer.
"Egalitarianism, Tefillah, and Halakhah." (Produced as a result of a project coordinated by Open Source:A Halakhah Think Tank, www.halakhah.org.)

References

External links
DC Minyan Frequently Asked Questions.
DC Minyan Bylaws.
Compilation of information on independent minyans in the U.S.
Recordings of selected sessions at Minyan Project conferences.
"Synthesis Outside the Synagogue," The Washington Post, April 29, 2009.
"An Orthodox blossoming In District, traditional offerings grow, as do names," The Washington Jewish Week, March 3, 2005.
"Any Old Shul Won't Do for the Young and Cool: Post-Boomers Have It Their Way at Spate of New Prayer Groups," April 10, 2001.
"Independent Minyanim Growing Rapidly, and the Jewish World is Noticing," JTA, Nov 11, 2008.
"Minyan Man," Tablet, Feb 19, 2010.
"Partnership Minyanim: Orthodoxy on the Edge (Or Maybe Even a Little Bit Over)," Jewish Voice and Opinion, July 2007.

Synagogues in Washington, D.C.
Dupont Circle
Independent minyanim
Unaffiliated synagogues in the United States